Leotia viscosa (common name, chicken lips) is a species of mushroom in the Leotiaceae family. Its stem color can be yellow, orange to white, and the cap is green. The cap comes in a variety of shapes. The edibility of this mushroom is unknown. It grows under conifer trees, or on dead logs.

External links
 Leotia viscosa at Mushroom Expert

Helotiales
Fungi of North America
Fungi described in 1822